A false flag operation is an act committed with the intent of disguising the actual source of responsibility and pinning blame on another party.

False Flag may also refer to:
False Flag (film),  2017 Nigerian film
False Flag (TV series), 2015 Israeli television series
"False Flag" (Burn Notice), episode of Burn Notice
"False Flag" (Waking the Dead episode), episode of the television series Waking the Dead
False Flag (The Desperate Mind EP), 2014 EP